Marasimha (1050 CE - 1075 CE) succeeded Gonka.  He was not very ambitious.  In a copper plate grant describes the fort of Kilagila as his capital. Guvala II succeeded his father in 1057 CE. However, till 1110 CE the history of the Shilahara family becomes complicated as all princes are mentioned as kings.

See also
 Shilahara

References
 Bhandarkar R.G. (1957): Early History of Deccan, Sushil Gupta (I) Pvt Ltd, Calcutta.
 Fleet J.F (1896) :The Dynasties of the Kanarese District of The Bombay Presidency, Written for the Bombay Gazetteer .
 Department of Gazetteer, Govt of Maharashtra (2002) : Itihaas : Prachin Kal, Khand -1 (Marathi)
 Department of Gazetteer, Govt of Maharashtra (1960) : Kolhapur District Gazetteer
 Department of Gazetteer, Govt of Maharashtra (1964) : Kolaba District Gazetteer
 Department of Gazetteer, Govt of Maharashtra (1982) : Thane District Gazetteer
 A.S.Altekar (1936) : The Silaharas of Western India

External links
 Silver Coin of Shilaharas of Southern Maharashtra (Coinex 2006 - Souvenir)

Medieval India